was a Japanese politician.

Born in Shizuoka Prefecture, Yoshiyuki represented Hyogo 4th district in the House of Representatives as a member of the New Komeito Party from 1969 to 1990, when he chose not to stand in that year's elections. He died of lung cancer in Himeji, Hyōgo on 7 March 2017, at the age of 82.

References

1934 births
2017 deaths
Kansai University alumni
Members of the House of Representatives (Japan)
Komeito politicians
Politicians from Shizuoka Prefecture
Politicians from Hyōgo Prefecture
Deaths from lung cancer in Japan